is a Japanese racing driver. A former competitor at the 24 Hours of Le Mans, he attempted to compete in the NASCAR Winston Cup Series in the early 2000s, but only qualified for four races before leaving the series. He was the first Japanese driver to compete in NASCAR's top series.

Career

Open-wheel and sports cars 
Competing in his native Japan, Fukuyama established a career as a road racer, winning the 1979 Formula Libre 500 Japanese championship, the 1992 Japanese Touring Car Championship and 1997 Super GT GT300 class championship, and winning the LMGT class at the 2000 24 Hours of Le Mans.

Stock cars 
Fukuyama made his debut in NASCAR competition driving in exhibition races at Suzuka Circuit in 1996 and 1997 for Travis Carter Enterprises, and at Twin Ring Motegi in 1998 for Jeff Davis Racing. He crashed in the inaugural Suzuka Thunder Special in 1996, finishing 22nd; in 1997 he finished 21st, retiring with ignition failure after 103 laps. In Motegi's Coca-Cola 500 he finished 17th in the No. 98 Ford.

In 1998 and 1999 Fukuyama competed in two events in the NASCAR Winston West Series, at Pikes Peak International Raceway in 1998, where he finished 19th, and in the first NASCAR points event held outside of North America, at Twin Ring Motegi in 1999, where he finished 15th.

Having been encouraged to pursue a NASCAR career by Dale Earnhardt, and in September at Dover International Speedway became the first Japanese driver to qualify for a Winston Cup Series points event. Driving the No. 66 Ford for Haas-Carter Motorsports, he started 43rd in the event, finishing 39th due to transmission failure. Later that year at Martinsville Speedway he finished 43rd in the second and final race of the year he qualified for.

In 2003, Fukuyama competed for Rookie of the Year in the Winston Cup Series, running a limited schedule in Cup as well as in the ARCA Racing Series for Carter, the team being renamed BelCar Racing. He only qualified for two races, at Las Vegas Motor Speedway and Infineon Raceway, posting his best career finish, 33rd, at the former track.

Released from his ride with TCM midway through the 2003 season, Fukuyama returned to his native Japan, where he resumed racing in the Super GT series, as well as becoming an analyst for Japanese television broadcasts of NASCAR.

Motorsports career results

24 Hours of Le Mans results

Complete Japanese Touring Car Championship (-1993) results

Complete JGTC results
(key) (Races in bold indicate pole position) (Races in italics indicate fastest lap)

NASCAR
(key) (Bold – Pole position awarded by qualifying time. Italics – Pole position earned by points standings or practice time. * – Most laps led.)

Winston Cup Series

Winston West Series

ARCA Re/Max Series
(key) (Bold – Pole position awarded by qualifying time. Italics – Pole position earned by points standings or practice time. * – Most laps led.)

References

External links
 
 Hideo Fukuyama at Driver Database

Living people
1955 births
Sportspeople from Mie Prefecture
Japanese racing drivers
24 Hours of Le Mans drivers
NASCAR drivers
Japanese Formula 3000 Championship drivers
Super GT drivers
Japanese Touring Car Championship drivers
World Sportscar Championship drivers
Nismo drivers
Dandelion Racing drivers